Huuvari is a village in Askola municipality in Eastern Uusimaa between Juornaankylä and Särkijärvi villages. It is located in the east part of the municipality, near the Lake Tiiläänjärvi, which is the largest lake in the municipality.

Sources 
 Kekkonen, Ilmo: Huuvarin-Särkijärven kyläkirja. Huuvari-Särkijärven nuorisoseura, 2002. .

External links 
 Huuvari–Särkijärvi kyläsivu – Official site

Askola
Villages in Finland